Baconin Borzacchini (Terni 28 September 1898 – Monza 10 September 1933) was an Italian Grand Prix motor racing driver often referred to as Mario Umberto Borzacchini.

Biography

Born Baconino Francesco Domenico Borzacchini in Terni in the Umbria region of Italy, at age 14 he began working in a garage, training as a repairman. After service in the army during World War I, he began racing motorcycles before turning to automobile competitions in 1926.  During the next two years he won six Italian hillclimbing events driving a Salmson. He earned victories at three significant Italian races including the Etna Cup at Catania and the 1100cc class at the 1926 and 1927 Targa Florio where he beat fellow up-and-comer Luigi Fagioli. Borzacchini's success ultimately led to an offer to join the Maserati racing team and driving for them, he won the 1927 Terni-Passo della Somma and the Coppa della Collina Pistoiese." In 1928 he drove a Maserati to first place in the Coppa Gallenga hillclimb at Rocca di Papa.

That same year, he finished second in the Circuito di Alessandria and in the Tripoli Grand Prix. 

In 1930, under the fascist regime of Italian dictator Benito Mussolini, Borzacchini was pressured into racing under the Italian name, Mario Umberto, rather than his birth name of Baconin, which was based on that of Russian revolutionary anarchist, Mikhail Bakunin, who his parents had admired.

Maserati entered the 1930 Indianapolis 500. Designed with a swept-back aerodynamic front end, a radical innovation unheard of at the time but commonplace today, it was felt that Borzacchini had a good chance to capture the prestigious American event. Unfortunately, magneto problems forced him out of the race after just three laps. However, Borzacchini and his Maserati claimed victory at the 1930 Tripoli Grand Prix and won another hillclimbing event, the Pontedecimo-Giovi at Genoa.

In 1931 he signed to drive Alfa Romeos for Scuderia Ferrari where he became a great friend of team-mate Tazio Nuvolari. Although he won the Circuito di Avellino, Borzacchini's season was dogged by both bad luck and the brilliance of Nuvolari. He finished second at the Targa Florio, the Grand Prix of Monza, and the Italian, Belgian and French Grands Prix.

At the 1932 French Grand Prix and the Coppa Ciano, driving the new Alfa Romeo P3 Borzacchini finished second behind team mate Nuvolari and third at Germany's Großer Preis von Deutschland. However, with co-driver Amadeo Bignami, he won the gruelling Mille Miglia and wound up the 1932 season finishing second overall to Nuvolari for the European Drivers Championship. When Alfa Romeo decided to withdraw from racing after the 1932 season and sold its cars to Enzo Ferrari, Borzacchini rejoined the Maserati team. United with Luigi Fagioli and Giuseppe Campari, in March 1933 he picked up where he had left off the previous year, finishing second to Nuvolari at the Grand Prix of Tunisia. In April he took another second at the Monaco Grand Prix, this time to the Bugatti of Achille Varzi and then earned a third-place finish at the Avusrennen in Germany, also won by Varzi. At the 1933 Targa Florio, held at the Circuito Piccolo delle Madonie, Borzacchini set the pace with the fastest lap but an accident forced him out of the race.

Death
10 September 1933 at the Autodromo Nazionale Monza was one of the blackest days in racing history. The Italian Grand Prix was held in the morning without serious incident, and was won by Luigi Fagioli. In an effort by the organizers to attract the largest possible crowd, another event called the Monza Grand Prix, using only the banked oval circuit, was staged in the afternoon. On a track dampened by a light drizzle, Borzacchini was vying with his team-mate Giuseppe Campari for the lead when Campari's vehicle slid on a patch of oil and crashed over the top of the banking and went into the trees, killing him. Borzacchini tried unsuccessfully to avoid the oil, and his car spun down to the infield and rolled over. Borzacchini was taken to the hospital, where he died later that day. After race officials restarted the event the third tragedy of the day occurred when the car of Polish driver Count Stanislas Czaykowski blew the engine, caught fire and crashed at the same location, burning him to death.

During his years of racing, Borzacchini participated in more than one hundred events. Although his number of victories is considerably less than some of the other Italian racing notables, he was much loved and respected by his countrymen. In his honor, the circuit in Magione in the Province of Perugia in Umbria, not far from where he was born, was named the "Autodromo Mario Umberto Borzacchini".

Borzacchini is interred in the local cemetery in his native Terni.

Racing record

Major career victories
Camaiore Circuit 1926
Targa Florio  (Junior class, 1100cc) 1926, 1927
Etna Cup 1928
Tripoli Grand Prix 1930
Coppa Principe di Piemonte 1931
Mille Miglia 1932

Indy 500 results

Complete European Championship results
(key) (Races in bold indicate pole position) (Races in italics indicate fastest lap)

Notes
 – Borzacchini was co-driver with Nuvolari at the Italian GP, Campari at the French GP and Nuvolari at the Belgian GP, therefore rules excluded him from the championship.

References

External links
Official site

1898 births
1933 deaths
Indianapolis 500 drivers
Italian racing drivers
People from Terni
Racing drivers who died while racing
Mille Miglia drivers
Sport deaths in Italy
Sportspeople from the Province of Terni
European Championship drivers
Grand Prix drivers